Amarynthus (Ancient Greek: Ἀμάρυνθος) was, in Greek mythology, a hunter of Artemis, from whom the town of Amarynthus in Euboea (Stephanus of Byzantium says that it was Euboea itself) was believed to have derived its name. From this hero, or rather from the town of Amarynthus, Artemis derived the surname Amarynthia or Amarysia, under which she was worshipped there and also in Attica.

Notes

References 

 Pausanias, Description of Greece with an English Translation by W.H.S. Jones, Litt.D., and H.A. Ormerod, M.A., in 4 Volumes. Cambridge, MA, Harvard University Press; London, William Heinemann Ltd. 1918. . Online version at the Perseus Digital Library
Pausanias, Graeciae Descriptio. 3 vols. Leipzig, Teubner. 1903.  Greek text available at the Perseus Digital Library.
 Strabo, The Geography of Strabo. Edition by H.L. Jones. Cambridge, Mass.: Harvard University Press; London: William Heinemann, Ltd. 1924. Online version at the Perseus Digital Library.
Strabo, Geographica edited by A. Meineke. Leipzig: Teubner. 1877. Greek text available at the Perseus Digital Library.

Deeds of Artemis
Retinue of Artemis